"Flesh and Blood" is a 1970 single written and recorded by Johnny Cash and was featured in the film, I Walk the Line starring Gregory Peck (see: soundtrack album I Walk the Line). The song went to #1 on the U.S. country singles chart for one week, spending a total of 13 weeks on the chart.

Content
The song describes a man observing and interacting with nature, but noting that it is no substitute for a human partner: "flesh and blood needs flesh and blood."

Chart performance

References

1970 singles
1970 songs
Johnny Cash songs
Rockabilly songs
Songs written for films
Songs written by Johnny Cash
Song recordings produced by Bob Johnston
Columbia Records singles
Anti-war songs